Sarcoglottis is a genus of flowering plants from the orchid family, Orchidaceae. It is widespread across much of Latin America from Mexico to Argentina, with one species extending northward into Trinidad and the Windward Islands.

Species accepted as of June 2014:

Sarcoglottis acaulis (Sm.) Schltr. - from Grenada and Trinidad to Bolivia
Sarcoglottis acutata (Rchb.f. & Warm.) Garay - Minas Gerais
Sarcoglottis alexandri Schltr. ex Mansf. - São Paulo, Paraná
Sarcoglottis amazonica Pabst - Brazil, Suriname, French Guiana
Sarcoglottis assurgens (Rchb.f.) Schltr . - Chiapas, Oaxaca, Campeche, Yucatán, Guatemala
Sarcoglottis biflora (Vell.) Schltr. - Brazil
Sarcoglottis cerina (Lindl.) P.N.Don in J.Donn - Oaxaca, Veracruz, Chiapas, Guatemala, El Salvador
Sarcoglottis curvisepala Szlach. & Rutk. - Bahia, Minas Gerais
Sarcoglottis degranvillei Szlach. & Veyret - French Guiana
Sarcoglottis depinctrix Christenson & Toscano - Espírito Santo, Rio de Janeiro
Sarcoglottis fasciculata (Vell.) Schltr. - Brazil, Argentina, Paraguay
Sarcoglottis glaucescens Schltr. - Rio Grande do Sul
Sarcoglottis gonzalezii L.C.Menezes - Minas Gerais
Sarcoglottis grandiflora (Hook.) Klotzsch - widespread across much of South America
Sarcoglottis heringeri Pabst - Brasília 
Sarcoglottis herzogii Schltr. - Bolivia
Sarcoglottis homalogastra (Rchb.f. & Warm.) Schltr. - Colombia, Peru, Brazil, Paraguay, Argentina 
Sarcoglottis itararensis (Kraenzl.) Hoehne - Paraná
Sarcoglottis juergensii Schltr. - Minas Gerais
Sarcoglottis lehmannii Garay - Colombia
Sarcoglottis lobata (Lindl.) P.N.Don in J.Donn - Hidalgo
Sarcoglottis magdalenensis (Brade & Pabst) Pabst - Brazil, Argentina
Sarcoglottis maroaensis G.A.Romero & Carnevali - Venezuela
Sarcoglottis metallica (Rolfe) Schltr. - Colombia, Venezuela, Guyana
Sarcoglottis micrantha Christenson - Peru
Sarcoglottis neglecta Christenson - Peru, Colombia, Panama, Costa Rica
Sarcoglottis pauciflora (Kuntze) Schltr. - central and southern Mexico, Guatemala, El Salvador, Honduras
Sarcoglottis portillae Christenson - Ecuador
Sarcoglottis pseudovillosa Mytnik, Rutk. & Szlach. - Paraguay
Sarcoglottis riocontensis E.C.Smidt & Toscano - Bahia
Sarcoglottis rosulata (Lindl.) P.N.Don in J.Donn - Guatemala, El Salvador, Honduras, Belize, Oaxaca
Sarcoglottis sceptrodes (Rchb.f.) Schltr - from central Mexico south to Panama
Sarcoglottis schaffneri (Rchb.f.) Ames in J.D.Smith - from central Mexico south to Honduras
Sarcoglottis schwackei (Cogn.) Schltr. - Brazil
Sarcoglottis scintillans (E.W.Greenw.) Salazar & Soto Arenas - Oaxaca
Sarcoglottis smithii (Rchb.f.) Schltr. - Nicaragua, Costa Rica
Sarcoglottis stergiosii Carnevali & I.Ramírez - Colombia, Venezuela, Guyana
Sarcoglottis tirolensis Burns-Bal. & Merc.S.Foster  - Paraguay
Sarcoglottis turkeliae Christenson - Ecuador
Sarcoglottis uliginosa Barb.Rodr.  - Brazil, Argentina, Paraguay
Sarcoglottis umbrosa (Barb.Rodr.) Schltr. - Brazil
Sarcoglottis ventricosa (Vell.) Hoehne - Brazil, Argentina
Sarcoglottis veyretiae Szlach. - Rio de Janeiro
Sarcoglottis villosa (Poepp. & Endl.) Schltr. - Brazil, Peru
Sarcoglottis viscosa Szlach. & Rutk. - Brazil
Sarcoglottis woodsonii (L.O.Williams) Garay - Panama

See also
 List of Orchidaceae genera

References

External links

Cranichideae genera
Spiranthinae